The 2010 Dartmouth Big Green football team represented Dartmouth College in the 2010 NCAA Division I FCS football season. The Big Green were led by head coach Buddy Teevens in his sixth straight year and 11th overall and played their home games at Memorial Field. They are a member of the Ivy League. They finished the season 6–4 overall and 3–4 in Ivy League play, placing fifth. Dartmouth averaged 5,971 fans per game.

Schedule

References

Dartmouth
Dartmouth Big Green football seasons
Dartmouth Big Green football